Fonjallaz is a surname. Notable people with the surname include:

Arthur Fonjallaz (1875–1944), Swiss military figure, publisher and fascist
Gaston Fonjallaz (born 1903), Swiss bobsledder
Gustave Fonjallaz (born 1910), Swiss bobsledder
René Fonjallaz (1907–1993), Swiss bobsledder